Ramseur is a town in Randolph County, North Carolina, United States. The population was 1,692 at the 2010 census.

Geography
Ramseur is located at  (35.733582, -79.653931).

According to the United States Census Bureau, the town has a total area of 1.7 square miles (4.3 km), of which 1.6 square miles (4.2 km)  is land and 0.04 square mile (0.1 km)  (1.80%) is water.

Demographics

2020 census

As of the 2020 United States census, there were 1,774 people, 638 households, and 415 families residing in the town.

2000 census
At the 2000 census there were 1,588 people, 652 households, and 444 families in the town. The population density was 968.0 people per square mile (373.9/km). There were 697 housing units at an average density of 424.9 per square mile (164.1/km).  The racial makeup of the town was 80.67% White, 10.96% African American, 0.25% Native American, 0.69% Asian, 5.04% from other races, and 2.39% from two or more races. Hispanic or Latino of any race were 8.25%.

Of the 652 households 32.1% had children under the age of 18 living with them, 47.7% were married couples living together, 16.6% had a female householder with no husband present, and 31.9% were non-families. 29.0% of households were one person and 16.1% were one person aged 65 or older. The average household size was 2.42 and the average family size was 2.95.

The age distribution was 26.3% under the age of 18, 7.9% from 18 to 24, 27.0% from 25 to 44, 21.1% from 45 to 64, and 17.8% 65 or older. The median age was 36 years. For every 100 females, there were 85.9 males. For every 100 females age 18 and over, there were 78.6 males.

The median household income was $32,961 and the median family income  was $42,153. Males had a median income of $28,500 versus $20,848 for females. The per capita income for the town was $15,411. About 10.2% of families and 14.8% of the population were below the poverty line, including 19.2% of those under age 18 and 22.1% of those age 65 or over.

History
Ramseur was named for Stephen Dodson Ramseur, a Confederate major general of the Civil War.

The Deep River-Columbia Manufacturing Company was listed on the National Register of Historic Places in 1978.

In film
Portions of the 1968 film Killers Three were shot in Ramseur and Coleridge areas, and many locals were cast as extras.

Notable people
B. Everett Jordan, United States Senator from 1959 to 1973
Heidi N Closet, drag queen and Miss Congeniality on season 12 of RuPaul's Drag Race

References

External links
 Town of Ramseur

Towns in North Carolina
Towns in Randolph County, North Carolina